Jaylen Smith may refer to:

 Jaylen Smith (politician) (born c. 2004),  American politician and mayor-elect of Earle, Arkansas
 Jaylen Smith (wide receiver) (born 1997), American football wide receiver

See also
 Jaylon Smith (born 1995), American football linebacker
 Jalen Smith (born 2000), American professional basketball player